There are 143 member institutions of UArctic, most of which are educational institutions and most of which are from the Arctic states (listed below). In addition, there are 21 members from non-Arctic states.

Canada

Denmark

Faroe Islands

Finland

Greenland

Iceland

Norway

Russia

Sweden

United States

Non-Arctic

Austria

China

France

Germany

Japan

Korea

Mongolia

United Kingdom

References 

International college and university associations and consortia
Members